Juan Carlos Sánchez Terrones (born 8 January 1991) is a Mexican professional boxer who held the IBF super flyweight title from 2012 to 2013.

Professional career
His first loss was to the undefeated Daniel Rosas in a bout for the vacant WBC CABOFE super flyweight title.

In December 2010, Juan Carlos beat the undefeated Juan Francisco Estrada at the Polideportivo Centenario in Los Mochis, Sinaloa, Mexico.

On February 2, 2012 Sánchez upset Rodrigo Guerrero to win the IBF super flyweight title.

In June 2013, Sánchez lost his world title due to not making weight for his fight against Argentine boxer Roberto Sosa.

Professional boxing record

See also
List of world super-flyweight boxing champions
List of Mexican boxing world champions

References

External links

 

1991 births
Living people
Mexican male boxers
Boxers from Sinaloa
Sportspeople from Los Mochis
Southpaw boxers
Super-flyweight boxers
Super-bantamweight boxers
World super-flyweight boxing champions
International Boxing Federation champions